Supakit Jinajai (born October 6, 1979), simply known as Pop is a Thai retired professional footballer who played as a forward.

Honours

Club
Provincial Electricity Authority
 Thai Premier League (1): 2008

Buriram
 Regional League Division 2 (1): 2010
 Thai Division 1 League (1): 2011

References

External links

1979 births
Living people
Supakit Jinajai
Supakit Jinajai
Association football forwards
Supakit Jinajai
Supakit Jinajai
Supakit Jinajai
Supakit Jinajai
Supakit Jinajai